Nathan Lamey (born 14 October 1980) is an English footballer who played in The Football League for Cambridge United.Also he is the brother of Aaron Mckoy-Lamey[Burton rugby club ]

References

English footballers
Cambridge United F.C. players
Wolverhampton Wanderers F.C. players
English Football League players
1982 births
Living people
Association football forwards